UserLinux was a project to create an operating system based on Debian, and targeted at business customers. The goal was to provide businesses with a freely available, high quality operating system accompanied by certifications, service, and support options.

The project was initiated by Bruce Perens in late 2003. Subsequent to 2005 and the major success of Ubuntu, a commercial Linux distribution based on Debian by Canonical Ltd. with much the same aims as UserLinux, the project lost steam. No software was shipped, and the project was ultimately abandoned.

References 
 Whither UserLinux? (Linux Weekly News)
 UserLinux: Autopsy (Linux Weekly News)

External links 

 userlinux.com  (last archived version in the Webarchive, 2007)
 

Debian-based distributions
Discontinued Linux distributions
Linux distributions